The non-marine mollusks of Jordan are a part of the fauna of Jordan. That country is land-locked and therefore it has no marine molluscs, only land and freshwater species, including snails, slugs, freshwater clams and freshwater mussels. There are ?? species of gastropods (19 species of freshwater gastropods, ?? species of land gastropods) and ?? species of freshwater bivalves living in the wild.

Summary table of number of species

Freshwater gastropods 

Neritidae
Theodoxus jordani (Sowerby, 1844)
Theodoxus macrii (Sowerby, 1844)

Bithyniidae
Bithynia philalensis (Conrad, 1852)

Valvatidae
Valvata saulcyi Bourguignat, 1853

Cochliopidae
 Eupaludestrina contempta (Dautzenberg, 1894)
 Eupaludestrina longiscata (Bourguignat, 1856)
 Pyrgophorus coronatus (L. Pfeiffer, 1840)- non-indigenous

Hydrobiidae
Globuliana gaillardotii (Bourguignat, 1856)
Pseudamnicola solitaria Tchernov, 1971

Thiaridae
Melanoides tuberculata (O. F. Müller, 1774)
Mieniplotia scabra (O. F. Müller, 1774) - non-indigenous

Melanopsidae
Melanopsis ammonis Tristram, 1865
Melanopsis buccinoidea Olivier, 1801
Melanopsis costata (Olivier, 1804)
 Melanopsis costata jordanica J. R. Roth, 1839
 Melanopsis costata lampra Bourguignat, 1884
 Melanopsis costata obliqua Bourguignat, 1884
Melanopsis saulcyi Bourguignat, 1853

Lymnaeidae
Galba truncatula (O. F. Müller, 1774)
Radix natalensis (Krauss, 1848)

Physidae
Physa acuta (Draparnaud, 1805)

Planorbidae
Bulinus truncatus (Audouin, 1827)
Gyraulus piscinarum (Bourguignat, 1852)
Planorbis planorbis (Linnaeus, 1758)

Land gastropods 

Pupillidae
 Pupoides coenopictus (T. Hutton, 1834)

Pyramidulidae
 Pyramidula rupestris (Draparnaud, 1801)

Chondrinidae
 Granopupa granum (Draparnaud, 1801)
 Rupestrella rhodia (J. R. Roth, 1839)

Truncatellidae
 Truncatellina haasi Venmans, 1957

Enidae
 Buliminus diminutus (Mousson, 1861)
 Buliminus jordani (Charpentier, 1847)
 Buliminus labrosus (Olivier, 1804)
 Buliminus marsabensis Westerlund, 1887
 Buliminus negevensis Heller, 1970
 Buliminus sinaiensis Heller, 1970
 Euchondrus chondriformis (Mousson, 1861)
 Euchondrus michonii (Bourguignat, 1853)
 Euchondrus saulcyi (Bourguignat, 1852)
 Euchondrus septemdentatus (J. R. Roth, 1839)
 Paramastus episomus (Bourguignat, 1857)
 Pene bulimoides (L. Pfeiffer, 1842)

Ferussaciidae
 Calaxis hierosolymarum (J. R. Roth, 1855)
 Cecilioides acicula (O. F. Müller, 1774)
 Cecilioides genezarethensis Forcart, 1981
 Cecilioides tumulorum (Bourguignat, 1856)

Achatinidae
 Rumina decollata (Linnaeus, 1758)

Punctidae
 Paralaoma servilis (Shuttleworth, 1852)

Oxychilidae
 Eopolita protensa jebusitica (J. R. Roth, 1855)
 Oxychilus renanianus (Pallary, 1939)

Pristilomatidae
 Vitrea contracta (Westerlund, 1871)

Limacidae
 Gigantomilax cecconii (Simroth, 1906)

Geomitridae
 Cochlicella acuta (O. F. Müller, 1774)
 Xerocrassa langloisiana (Bourguignat, 1853)
 Xerocrassa seetzeni (L. Pfeiffer, 1847)
 Xerocrassa simulata (Ehrenberg, 1831)
 Xerocrassa tuberculosa (Conrad, 1852)
 Xeropicta krynickii (Krynicki, 1833)

Helicidae
Eobania vermiculata (O. F. Müller, 1774) - non-indigenous
 Helix engaddensis Bourguignat, 1852
 Levantina spiriplana (Olivier, 1801)
 Levantina spiriplana caesareana (Mousson, 1854)
 Levantina spiriplana spiriplana (Olivier, 1801)

Hygromiidae
 Monacha crispulata (Mousson, 1861)
 Monacha obstructa (L. Pfeiffer, 1842)

Sphincterochilidae
 Sphincterochila cariosa (Olivier, 1804)
 Sphincterochila fimbriata (Bourguignat, 1852)
 Sphincterochila prophetarum (Bourguignat, 1852)
 Sphincterochila zonata (Bourguignat, 1853)
 Sphincterochila zonata filia (Mousson, 1861)
 Sphincterochila zonata zonata (Bourguignat, 1853)

Freshwater bivalves
Sphaeriidae
 Euglesa casertana (Poli, 1791)
 Odhneripisidium annandalei (Prashad, 1925)

See also
 Wildlife of Jordan
Lists of non-marine molluscs of surrounding countries:
 List of non-marine molluscs of Israel
 List of non-marine molluscs of Syria
 List of non-marine molluscs of Iraq
 List of non-marine molluscs of Saudi Arabia

References

Lists of biota of Jordan
Jordan